The Young Lovers (U.S. Chance Meeting) is a 1954 British Cold War romantic drama film directed by Anthony Asquith and starring Odile Versois and David Knight. The film was produced by Anthony Havelock-Allan, with cinematography from Jack Asher and screenplay by George Tabori and Robin Estridge. It was shot at Pinewood Studios with sets designed by the art directors John Box and John Howell. At the 1955 British Film Academy Awards, The Young Lovers picked up the prizes for Best Screenplay and Most Promising Newcomer to Film (David Kossoff).

Plot
Ted Hutchens (Knight) is a code expert working in intelligence at the American Embassy in London. On a night out to the Royal Ballet at Covent Garden he meets a young woman named Anna (Versois), and the pair fall immediately in love. The problem is that Anna is the daughter of the Soviet ambassador in London. It is made clear to both that their relationship cannot continue in such a political climate, and their movements are constantly monitored by surveillance units from both sides. However they continue to meet in secret, attempting to outwit both the American and Soviet surveillance services. Eventually, when Anna discovers she is pregnant, the couple decide that their love is stronger than the demands of political exigency, and make their escape together across a stormy English Channel. The film is open-ended, with no indication as to whether or not they succeed.

The Young Lovers was noted in its time for its relatively frank depiction of a sexual relationship between a non-married couple, and was praised for its even-handedness in presenting Anna's father (Kossoff) in a sympathetic manner, as a man torn between his political duty and the desire for his daughter's happiness.

Cast
 Odile Versois as Anna Szobek
 David Knight as Ted Hutchens
 Joseph Tomelty as Moffatt
 David Kossoff as Geza Szobek
 Theodore Bikel as Joseph
 Paul Carpenter as Gregg Pearson
 Peter Illing as Dr. Weissbrod
 John McLaren as Col. Margetson
 Bernard Rebel as Stefan
 Jill Adams as Judy
 Betty Marsden as Mrs. Forrester
 Peter Dyneley as Regan
 Percy Herbert as 	Richards
 Dora Bryan as Switchboard Operator
 Sam Kydd as Driver
 Aubrey Mather as 	Waiter 
 Victor Maddern as 	Sailor
 Robin Bailey as Thomas Cook cashier
 Joan Sims as Telephone Operator

References

External links 
 
 
 

1954 films
1950s romance films
British romance films
Films directed by Anthony Asquith
Cold War films
British black-and-white films
1950s English-language films
Films shot at Pinewood Studios
Films produced by Anthony Havelock-Allan
1950s British films